Three ships of the Royal Navy have borne the name HMS Rippon, an archaic version of Ripon, a city in North Yorkshire. A fourth has been named HMS Ripon:

  was a 64-gun third rate launched in 1712, rebuilt in 1735 as a 60-gun fourth rate and broken up in 1751.
  was a 60-gun fourth rate launched in 1758, reduced to harbour service in 1801 and broken up in 1808.
  was a 74-gun third rate launched in 1812 and broken up in 1821.
  was an aircraft transport launched in 1945 and sold in 1959.

See also
 

Royal Navy ship names